Vintage Violence is the debut solo studio album by Welsh musician John Cale, released on 25 March 1970 by Columbia Records. Cale and Lewis Merenstein produced the album.

Recording
Produced for a mere $15,000 ($115,000 in 2022), Cale stated in his autobiography What's Welsh for Zen? that there wasn't "much originality on that album, it's just someone teaching himself to do something". He also "thought the songs were simplistic". He pieced together a band to play on the album, and they named themselves Penguin. However, the band didn't last beyond the recording sessions.

Content
The cover of the album features Cale with his face obscured by a glass mask over a nylon stocking, which he would later cite in his autobiography as symbolic of the content of the record: "You're not really seeing the personality".

Release
Vintage Violence was released on 25 March 1970 by record label Columbia.

The album was re-released in remastered form in 2001.

Critical reception

Vintage Violence received mostly positive reviews. Rolling Stone magazine's Ed Ward said that the album sounds "like a Byrds album produced by Phil Spector who has marinated for six years in burgundy, anise and chili peppers". Ward was also quoted in Billboard magazine as saying, "I believe that this is destined to become one of the most important albums of the past few years."

Greil Marcus described it as "an exquisite, unheard solo album that was in some ways comparable to Van Morrison's Astral Weeks: the personal vision was that intense, the execution almost as graceful."

In his retrospective review, Mark Deming of AllMusic wrote: "John Cale had the strongest avant-garde credentials of anyone in The Velvet Underground, but he was also the Velvet whose solo career was the least strongly defined by his work with the band, and [...] Vintage Violence certainly bears this out."

Track listing

Personnel
Credits are adapted from the Vintage Violence liner notes.
John Cale –  vocals, bass guitar, guitar, keyboards, arrangements, conductor 
Penguin
Garland Jeffreys –  guitar, backing vocals
Ernie Corallo –  guitar
Sanford Konikoff –  drums
Harvey Brooks – bass guitar
Stan Szelest –  piano

Production
John Cale – producer
Lewis Merenstein – producer 
John McClure –  executive production
Don Meehan – engineer
Jim Reeves – engineer
Israel "Isi" Véléris –  photography

References

External links

John Cale albums
1970 debut albums
Albums produced by John Cale
Columbia Records albums
Albums produced by Lewis Merenstein